Peter "Kosta" Johansson (born 03 September 1956) is a Swedish former football player.

Career
A forward, Johansson started out his career playing in Allsvenskan with Östers IF but later moved on to play with GAIS and making the Swedish National team.

As a 25-year-old college junior, Johansson scored a golden goal in the finals of the 1981 NCAA Division II Soccer Championship to give the Tampa Spartans their first national championship. He finished his college career as UT's all-time scoring leader with 57 goals.

In December 1983 he signed a contract with the Tampa Bay Rowdies and remained with them through the remainder of the 1983–84 indoor season.

References

External links 
 Tränarföreningen Profile
 GAIS Profile
 NASL stats

1955 births
Living people
Association football forwards
Swedish footballers
Allsvenskan players
Östers IF players
GAIS players
Tampa Bay Rowdies (1975–1993) players
North American Soccer League (1968–1984) indoor players
Swedish football managers
IFK Värnamo managers
Tampa Spartans men's soccer players